Songwu Lu from the University of California, Los Angeles, CA was named Fellow of the Institute of Electrical and Electronics Engineers (IEEE) in 2016 for contributions to wireless and mobile networking and network security.
He was elected as an ACM Fellow in 2019 "for helping create a more resilient and performant cellular network".

References 

Fellow Members of the IEEE
Fellows of the Association for Computing Machinery
Living people
University of California, Los Angeles faculty
21st-century American engineers
University of Illinois alumni
Year of birth missing (living people)
American electrical engineers